The 1996 Ugandan Super League was the 29th season of the official Ugandan football championship, the top-level football league of Uganda.

Overview
The 1996 Uganda Super League was contested by 16 teams and was won by Express FC, while Entebbe Works FC, Coffee Kakira, Villa International and Bushenyi United were relegated.

League standings

Leading goalscorer
The top goalscorer in the 1996 season was David Kiwanuka of Uganda Electricity Board FC with 21 goals.

Footnotes

External links
 Uganda - List of Champions - RSSSF (Hans Schöggl)
 Ugandan Football League Tables - League321.com

Ugandan Super League seasons
1
Uganda
Uganda